Belazariškiai is a village in the Ukmergė district municipality, Lithuania, on the River Neris. According to the 2011 census, its population was 50. 

Belazariškiai used to belong to the landed estate of the Polish noble family of Tekla Przecławska.

References

  Słownik geograficzny Królestwa Polskiego i innych krajów

Villages in Vilnius County
Ukmergė District Municipality